Dasysphecia is a genus of moths in the family Sesiidae.

Species
Dasysphecia bombyliformis (Rothschild, 1911)
Dasysphecia bombylina  Arita & Kallies, 2005
Dasysphecia ursina  Kallies & Arita, 2005

References

Sesiidae